Michael David Kramer (born July 25, 1955) is a former American football coach and former player, most recently the head football coach at Idaho State University of the Big Sky Conference.  Kramer was previously the head coach at two other schools in the conference: Eastern Washington University (1994–1999) and Montana State University (2000–2006).  Kramer has coached teams to four Big Sky championships, one at Eastern Washington (1997), and three at Montana State (2002, 2003, and 2005). Kramer retired from his position at Idaho State on March 30, 2017.

Playing career
A native of Colton, Washington, on the Palouse south of Pullman, Kramer graduated from Colton High School in 1972 and played college football at the University of Idaho in nearby Moscow.  He was a lineman for the Vandals for four seasons under head coaches Don Robbins and Ed Troxel. He started nine games at defensive end as a true freshman in 1972, and seven on offense at center as a sophomore. During his final two seasons he started at guard for offensive coordinator Dennis Erickson.

Kramer was named most inspirational player (Hec Edmundson award) and the team's outstanding blocker as a senior in 1975. He was a member of Phi Gamma Delta fraternity, received his bachelor's degree from UI in 1977, and later earned a master's degree from EWU.

Coaching career
Kramer began coaching in 1976 at his alma mater, Colton High, as an assistant for the 1976 season, then moved to Montana to coach at Helena High School, as an assistant for three years and as head coach for another three. He moved up to the college level at Montana State in 1983, coaching the defensive line under head coach Dave Arnold and the Bobcats won the Big Sky title and the I-AA national championship in 1984. He was the defensive coordinator for the next two seasons, which were much less successful, and Arnold and the staff was fired.  Kramer coached in western Washington at Stadium High School in Tacoma for two seasons, then joined the staff at Eastern Washington in 1989 and coached the defensive line for five years.  When head coach Dick Zornes retired, Kramer was promoted and led the Eagles for six seasons, through 1999.

Head coaching record

College

References

External links
 Idaho State profile

1955 births
Living people
American football defensive linemen
American football offensive linemen
Eastern Washington Eagles football coaches
Idaho State Bengals football coaches
Idaho Vandals football players
Montana State Bobcats football coaches
High school football coaches in Montana
High school football coaches in Washington (state)
People from Colton, Washington
Coaches of American football from Washington (state)
Players of American football from Washington (state)